Ouroux is a former commune in the Rhône department in eastern France. On 1 January 2019, it was merged into the new commune Deux-Grosnes.

See also
Communes of the Rhône department

References

Former communes of Rhône (department)
Beaujolais (province)